"Billions" is a song by American singer-songwriter and record producer Caroline Polachek. It was released on February 9, 2022 as the second single from Polachek's fourth album, Desire, I Want to Turn Into You (2023).

Background and composition 
Polachek played the song live on her Heart is Unbreaking US tour in late 2021, and on several fall 2021 festival dates before the single was officially released.

A September 2021 New Yorker profile on Polachek explained the song's backstory as follows:[…] One day, Danny L Harle sent her a beat that he'd written, and Polachek heard a melody out of nowhere, oceanic and potent, and started jotting down psychedelic images: a headless angel, an overflowing cup, a pearl inside an oyster. The beat and the images became the song "Billions". [Polachek said she] "wanted something that captured the afterglow of a reopening."

As the B-side of the single, Polachek released a reworked version of "Long Road Home", her collaboration with Oneohtrix Point Never from his 2020 album Magic Oneohtrix Point Never.

Reception 
The song was met with widespread critical acclaim. Pitchfork named the song a 'Best New Track', and in a review contributor Gio Santiago wrote that "Billions" is "a lucent pathway towards a new era for the pop auteur". The Faders Jordan Daville wrote that, with "Billions", Harle and Polachek created "a kind of divine symmetry from its elements, channeling Pure Moods-era new age into something utterly splendid". Kat Bouza from Rolling Stone described "Billions" as "a trip-hop inspired, hallucinogenic epic that finds the songwriter expanding upon the inventive production style perfected on her critically acclaimed 2019 album, Pang."

Track listing 
Billions — Single

 "Billions" — 4:57
 "Long Road Home" (featuring Oneohtrix Point Never) — 3:44

Charts

References 

2022 songs
Caroline Polachek songs